Antonio D. James, (born June 3, 1985) is an American film director from Memphis, Tennessee.

Early life
James was born in Memphis, Tennessee on June 3, 1985 and was raised by his mother and stepfather in Memphis' Northaven community. He spent most of his teenage years in Hickory Hill with his biological father. By his first year at Millington Central High School in Millington, Tennessee, he had already attended several schools. He graduated in 2003.

Career
James enlisted in the United States Air Force after college but returned to Memphis after one term. He faced hardships including lack of employment opportunities there but this led him to discover filmmaking as a hobby. He and his uncle began filming music videos for Media Workz and Catina Johnson, short films, and commercials. He worked as a videographer at the Memphis Veteran Affairs Medical Center and later was the official videographer for Al Sharpton's National Access News. He was also the videographer for the non-profit Arize V Renaissance Center. His film debut was in 2013 with Trey, which he produced and directed. Though the film was expected to cost $400,000, he spent only $750. The movie received awards from the Independent Filmmakers Showcase, the Texas Black Film Festival, and Action on Film International Film Festival.

Personal life
James relocated to Los Angeles following the release of Trey.

Filmography

Director
 Trey (2013)
 Pushing Through (2013)
 Father's Moment of Truth (2013)
 Free's Freedom (2014) 
 The Real Dancers of North Hollywood (2014)
 Pushed Below (2016)
 Resolution Song (2018)

Cinematographer
 Trey (2013)
 Pushing Through (2013)
 Father's Moment of Truth (2013)
 Allison (2014)
 Foiled (2015)
 Fire and Ice (2021)

Actor
 General Hospital (2013) - trainer 
 Neighbors (2014) - extra
 Pocket Watch (2016) - Don Trump

References

1985 births
African-American film directors
Living people
People from Memphis, Tennessee
Film directors from Tennessee
21st-century African-American people
20th-century African-American people